Sóstenes Silva Cavalcante (born 16 January 1975) is a Brazilian politician and pastor. Although born in Alagoas, he has spent his political career representing Rio de Janeiro (state), having served as state representative since 2015.

Personal life
Cacalcante is married to Isleia Cavalcante. He is a pastor of the Assembleias de Deus church.

Political career
Cavalcante voted in favor of the impeachment against then-president Dilma Rousseff and political reformation. He would later back Rousseff's successor Michel Temer against a similar impeachment motion, and also voted in favor of the Brazil labor reform (2017).

Due to his evangelical beliefs Cacalcante is strongly against same-sex marriage, and since his time in the chambers of deputies has been pushing for a bill that would define marriage as exclusively between a man and woman. During his time in office Cacalcante has lobbyed with other evangelical politicians including Eduardo Cunha and Everaldo Pereira.

References

1975 births
Living people
People from Maceió
Liberal Party (Brazil, 2006) politicians
Brazilian Assemblies of God pastors
Members of the Chamber of Deputies (Brazil) from Rio de Janeiro (state)